Radu Jercan (24 October 1945 – 29 September 2012) was a Romanian football forward and manager.

International career
Radu Jercan played two friendly games at international level for Romania, making his debut under coach Gheorghe Ola in a 4–2 away victory against Morocco. His second game was a 2–2 against Peru.

Honours
Argeș Pitești
Divizia A: 1971–72

References

External links

1945 births
2012 deaths
Romanian footballers
Romania international footballers
Association football forwards
Liga I players
Liga II players
Victoria București players
FC Argeș Pitești players
Romanian football managers